First-seeded Roy Emerson defeated Fred Stolle 7–9, 2–6, 6–4, 7–5, 6–1 in the final to win the men's singles tennis title at the 1965 Australian Championships.

Seeds
The seeded players are listed below. Roy Emerson is the champion; others show the round in which they were eliminated.

  Roy Emerson (champion)
  Fred Stolle (finalist)
  John Newcombe (semifinals)
  Tony Roche (semifinals)
  Pierre Darmon (quarterfinals)
  Pierre Barthès (third round)
  Lew Gerrard (third round)
  Tom Okker (second round)
  Owen Davidson (quarterfinals)
  Bill Bowrey (quarterfinals)
  Barry Phillips-Moore (third round)
  Warren Jacques (first round)
  Graham Stilwell (second round)
  Osamu Ishiguro (third round)
  François Jauffret (third round)
  Jan Hajer (first round)

Draw

Key
 Q = Qualifier
 WC = Wild card
 LL = Lucky loser
 r = Retired

Finals

Earlier rounds

Section 1

Section 2

Section 3

Section 4

External links
 1965 Australian Championships on ITFtennis.com, the source for this draw

1965 in tennis
1965
1965 in Australian tennis